Mădălin Murgan (born 16 May 1983) is a Romanian former professional football player who played as a midfielder for teams such as Extensiv Craiova, FC U Craiova, Argeș Pitești, Dacia Mioveni or Pandurii Târgu Jiu, among others.

External links
 
 
 

1983 births
Living people
Sportspeople from Craiova
Romanian footballers
Association football midfielders
Liga I players
FC U Craiova 1948 players
FC Argeș Pitești players
FC Unirea Urziceni players
CSM Ceahlăul Piatra Neamț players
CS Mioveni players
CS Pandurii Târgu Jiu players
Liga II players
FC Olt Slatina players
FC Voluntari players
Liga III players